Szántó is a Hungarian surname. Notable people with the surname include:

Anna Szántó (born 1966), Hungarian handball player
Bela Szanto (1881–1951), Hungarian Communist politician
Csaba Szantó, Hungarian sprint canoer
Enid Szánthó (1907–1997), Hungarian operatic contralto
Paul B. Szanto (1905–1989), pathologist
Stephan Szántó (1541–1612), Hungarian Jesuit
Theodor Szántó (1877–1934), Hungarian pianist and composer

See also
Szanto Spur

Hungarian-language surnames